Lorenzo Hoopes (November 5, 1913 – September 21, 2012) spent much of his career as an executive for Safeway.  When he retired in 1979 he was the senior vice president at Safeway.  He had taken a leave of absence from Safeway back in 1953, during the administration of President Dwight D. Eisenhower, to serve as executive assistant to United States Secretary of Agriculture Ezra Taft Benson.  Hoopes returned to Safeway in 1955.

Hoopes grew up in Brigham City, Utah and graduated from Box Elder High School.  Hoopes received his bachelor's degree from Weber State University and also studied at the University of Utah.  He earned an MBA from Pepperdine University and did advanced management training at Harvard Business School.

Hoopes was serving as bishop of the Oakland California Ward that included where the Oakland Temple now is when the ground was broken for the first LDS meetinghouse on that general site in about 1957.  He later also served as president of the LDS Church's Oakland California Stake.

Hoopes served as chairman and member of the Board of the Foundation for American Agriculture; vice chairman and member of the Board of the Farm Foundation; president and member of California’s Coordinating Council for Higher Education; chairman, director, and secretary of the National Dairy Council; and chairman and member of the National Advisory Council.

Hoopes was a member of the Church of Jesus Christ of Latter-day Saints (LDS Church).  Hoopes served as president of the England Bristol Mission of the LDS Church from 1979-1982.  He served as president of the Oakland Temple from 1985 to 1990.

Hoopes served for 17 years as a member of the Oakland School board.

Hoopes' wife, Stella Bobbies Sorenson Hoopes, died on January 14, 1996.  Among Hoopes' children is David C. Hoopes and Janet Hoopes (deceased).

Hoopes was as of January 2010 the head of the Paramount Theatre Board in Oakland, California.  The Paramount Theatre is a public institution with a board that appoints new members, with the consent of the city council and mayor, but in the past the decisions of the board have always been upheld.  Hoopes was believed to be the person in Oakland who donated the largest amount of money to the Yes on Proposition 8 campaign, which caused some to seek to oust Hoopes from his unpaid volunteer position with the Paramount Theatre.  He sat on the board of the theatre for nearly 30 years.

Notes

Sources
Sept 21, 2012, Published on September 26, 2012
January 18, 2010 article on opposition to Hoopes reappointment
New York Times, January 20, 2010
"Deaths", Church News, January 20, 1996
Article on attempt to oust Hoopes
list of presidents of the Oakland Temple
bio of Hoopes from Utah State University
Church News October 7, 2012.

1913 births
School board members in California
Harvard Business School alumni
2012 deaths
Mission presidents (LDS Church)
People from Brigham City, Utah
People from Oakland, California
Pepperdine University alumni
Temple presidents and matrons (LDS Church)
Weber State University alumni
University of Utah alumni
American Mormon missionaries in England
20th-century Mormon missionaries
Safeway Inc.
American leaders of the Church of Jesus Christ of Latter-day Saints
Latter Day Saints from Utah
Latter Day Saints from California